Polar Pioneer is a Finnish-built expedition cruise ship managed by the Swedish shipowners Polar Alca Maritime AB.

The ship was built in Finland in 1982 as the Akademik Schuleykin, an ice-strengthened research ship, and for many years she plied the waters of the USSR's northern coast. In 2000 she was refurbished in St. Petersburg to provide comfortable accommodation for 54 passengers.

Her sister ships are Akademik Shokalskiy, Arnold Veymer, Akademik Gamburtsev, Professor Molchanov, Professor Multanovskiy, Geolog Dmitriy Nalivkin, Professor Polshkov, Professor Khromov.

Polar Pioneer is chartered by Polar Pioneer Management AS.

Specifications 
 Length 71.61 metres
 Beam 12.8 metres
 Draft 4.5 metres
 Cruising Speed 10 knots
 Displacement 2140 tons
 Registry Cyprus
 Classification society  RINA
 Equipment: Zodiacs, Kayaks, Diving (some trips), Ice Climbing (some trips), Camping (some trips).

References

External links 
 Polar Pioneer Management AS
 Polar Alca Maritime AB
 Polar Cruises

Cruise ships
1985 ships